Enos J. Hazard (1810-1857) was a member of the Wisconsin State Assembly during the 1849 session. He was a Whig.

References

Wisconsin Whigs
19th-century American politicians
1810 births
1857 deaths